The Palau flycatcher (Myiagra erythrops) is a species of bird in the family Monarchidae. It is endemic to Palau.

Taxonomy and systematics
Some authorities consider the Palau flycatcher to be a subspecies of the oceanic flycatcher. Alternate names include mangrove flycatcher, Micronesian broadbill, Palau broadbill, Palau Myiagra flycatcher, rufous-faced flycatcher and rufous-faced Myiagra flycatcher.

References

External links
Photo on Flickr

Myiagra
Birds of Palau
Endemic birds of Palau
Birds described in 1868
Taxonomy articles created by Polbot